Sigara distincta is a species of water boatman in the family Corixidae in the order Hemiptera.

References

External link

Insects described in 1848
Sigara